The territorial distribution of judicial authority in Ontario dates to the early years of British rule following the Conquest of New France. In 1788 the government of the Province of Quebec divided the western portion of the colony into four "districts": Hesse, Nassau, Mecklenburg, and Lunenburg. Following the Constitutional Act 1791, these districts became the basis of the newly created Upper Canada. In 1792 the districts were renamed Western, Home, Midland, and Eastern. At this time the government began subdividing districts into counties, and counties into townships.

In October 1792, the Parliament of Upper Canada passed An act for building a gaol and court house in every district within this province. This law handed judicial power to districts and mandated the construction of a courthouse in each district town.

During the first half of the 19th century, the borders of districts, counties, and townships changed frequently from realignments, mergers, and newly created areas. In 1849 the government abolished the district system and transferred all judicial and administrative responsibilities to individual counties. Each county created a county seat, which served as its capital and was home to its courthouse. Following the 1849 abolition of districts, counties that did not possess a former district courthouse had to build a new edifice.

In the 20th century many of Ontario's historic counties were replaced by regional or metropolitan areas. The majority the province's 19th century courthouses still exist and have legal protection on the Canadian Register of Historic Places. Ontario's historic courthouses represent a diverse array of architectural styles, including Italianate, Romanesque, Greek Revival, Second Empire, and Art Deco.

District courthouses (pre-1849)

County courthouses (post-1849)

References 

Courthouses
Ontario